Fundamenta Informaticae is a peer-reviewed scientific journal covering computer science. The editor-in-chief is Damian Niwiński. It was established in 1977 by the Polish Mathematical Society as Series IV of the Annales Societatis Mathematicae Polonae, with its main focus on theoretical foundations of computer science. The journal is currently hosted on the Episciences.org platform of the Center for direct scientific communication, and published by IOS Press under the auspices of the European Association for Theoretical Computer Science.

Further reading 
 Janusz Kowalski, 2004. The Polish Mathematical Society (PTM). European Mathematical Society Newsletter 54:24-29.

External links 
 

Computer science journals
Theoretical computer science
IOS Press academic journals
Publications established in 1977
English-language journals
5 times per year journals